The 2010–11 Ole Miss Rebels men's basketball team represented the University of Mississippi during the 2010–11 college basketball season. This was head coach Andy Kennedy's fifth season at Ole Miss. The Rebels competed in the Southeastern Conference and played their home games at Tad Smith Coliseum. They finished the season 20–14, 9–7 in SEC play. They lost in the quarterfinals of the 2011 SEC men's basketball tournament to Kentucky. They were invited to the 2011 National Invitation Tournament where they lost in the first round to California.

Schedule

|-
!colspan=9 style=| Exhibition

|-
!colspan=9 style=| Non-conference regular season

|-
!colspan=9 style=| SEC regular season

|-
!colspan=9 style=| 2011 SEC tournament

|-
!colspan=9 style=| NIT

References

Ole Miss
Ole Miss
Ole Miss Rebels men's basketball seasons
Ole Miss Rebels
Ole Miss Rebels